George Littlewood (1859–1912) was a professional pedestrian known as the Sheffield Flyer who still holds the 6-day world record for walking. This was achieved in Sheffield, England, between 6 and 11 March 1882, on a 13-lap to the mile track, 531 miles.

Littlewood is also famous for setting the British 6-day race record of 623 miles 1,320 yards – a record that still stands today. This Multiday race took place at Madison Square Gardens in New York between 26 November and 1 December 1888. That world record wasn't beaten for 96 years.

Biography
George Littlewood was born on 20 March 1859, in Rawmarsh, Yorkshire, England.

In November 1879, Littlewood starred in his first race as a budding long-distance athlete in a six-day, 72-hour, 12 hours per day, 'go-as-you-please' event in which he came in fourth of 28 contestants winning a prize of £4 for scoring 275 miles in the allotted time on a 19-lap to the mile track at Wolverhampton.

He then went Nottingham, in February 1880, where, in a 7-day, six hours per night contest, he came in 5th of 19 runners, winning £2.

A couple of months later, he went to Leeds where he won his first race in a field of 13 contestants and created a new 12 hours per day, 72-hour world record of 374 miles on a 38-lap to the mile track in a circus rink. For winning, he secured the £35 first prize — plus an extra prize of £10 for beating the record. Littlewood would later remark that this was the greatest race he ever won.

His next event which was his first venture to London, where in September, of the same year, and competing in field of 29 at the Agricultural Hall, Islington, he won the Sir John Astley, 'Champion Gold Medal' and a prize of £60, which included £10 for beating the then world record of 405 miles.

Now established as an up-and-coming figure in his chosen sport, his connections entered the then 21-year-old into the 6th international version of the Astley Belt — the blue riband 142-hour, six days, 'go-as you-please' contest again at the “Aggie”. He would be up against the reigning long-distance champion — the formidable Charles Rowell — a man, who only the year before at Madison Square Garden, New York, had secured phenomenal prize money of $50,000 in two races in that city. During the race, in which he finished as runner-up with a score of 470 miles, George also took on the great “Blower” Brown of Fulham, and some very good American athletes.

Littlewood then went over to the USA for the first time to compete in the '2nd O’Leary International Belt' contest at Madison Square Garden, in 1881. Although starting the favorite, Littlewood only managed to make 480 miles due to a foot injury.

Then, in 1882, between 6 and 11 March, Littlewood achieved the unthinkable. Not only did he beat the then 142-hour heel-and-toe world walking record of 530 miles, he still holds it! The 531 miles were made on a 13-lap to the mile track at the Norfolk Drill Hall, Sheffield.

Progress of Six-Day Walking World Record (1881–2018)

He then competed in the 1st, 2nd, 3rd, 4th and 5th 'Astley Challenge Belt' races. The belt was the prize for winning the 12 hours a day, 72 hours per week version of the 'Long-Distance Astley Belt' and the events took place in Birmingham, Sheffield and London, between April 1882 and November, 1884. Littlewood would eventually win the belt outright.

In 1883, he also raced against a horse called Charlie in a 17-mile race from Doncaster to Sheffield. He lost by three quarters of a mile.

After that, and in April, 1885, Littlewood took on Rowell again (Rtd) in the 'International Pedestrian Tournament' and then again in February 1887 in the 'International Pedestrian Go-As-You-Please Tournament' (Won); both races being held at the Westminster Aquarium, London.

After those races he went back to America for the second time; firstly to Philadelphia, where he annihilated the opposition in November, 1887, in the 'Championship of the World Sweepstakes' before returning to New York to compete in his last two races at Madison Square Garden in May and December of the following year, 1888.

The May race saw Littlewood breaking the 600-mile barrier despite running on a raw bone in his foot and when he brought the Fox Diamond Belt back from America to England, they called him “Littlewood the Lionheart”.

In 1966, and referring to his 1888 world record, a physiologist, B.B. Lloyd, writing in Advancement of Science, described Littlewood's feat as “probably about the maximum sustained output of which the human frame is capable”.

Professional Career Statistics (1879–1888)

Death
George Littlewood died on 4 December 1912 in Sheffield. His funeral was attended by 3,000 people.

Bibliography
 764pp.

External links
King of the Peds
Athletics: Littlewood's giant strides
King of Pedestrianism
Walking Into History
Memories of City's Greatest Sport Star
Sporting heroes: Littlewood’s walk on the wild side

1859 births
1912 deaths
Walkers of the United Kingdom
British ultramarathon runners
Male ultramarathon runners